University Technical College Norfolk is a University Technical College in Old Hall Road, Norwich, with a focus on the advanced engineering and energy sectors.

The UTC sponsors include the University of East Anglia and Lotus Cars.

Description 
The University Technical College Norfolk is a 14-19 school, providing Key Stage 4 and Key Stage 5 education, pupils have to make a conscious decision to leave their existing secondary school at the end of year 9, which for many will be one year into their GCSE courses. It cannot be assessed on the governments favoured Progress 8 metric, which judges improvement from year 7 to the end of year 11.

The government has asked all UTCs to consider becoming 11-19 schools. University Technical College Norfolk is now (July 2020) consulting on making this change, which if agreed would take effect from September 2021. Additional finance will need to be found, a change in the PAN (pupil admission number) and a suitable site.

Academics
The school operates restricted curriculum at Key Stage 4. While engineering and computing are core subjects, there are no modern languages, and only two options slots which will be used for the History and Geography. 
There is no Core Art, Drama, Dance, Textiles or Ethics/RE.

The two option lines offer :
 Business Studies, Geography, Sport (VCERT), Practical Engineering
 Art, Business, Geography, History.
Choose one from each line.

Each of these gets 5 periods a fortnight. The English Baccalaureate is not possible due to the lack of a language 

At Key Stage 5, the timetable is made up of a  12 period work placement a core project of 4 periods a fortnight, and 4 option blocks of 9 periods.

Ofsted inspected the college in May 2019 and found a well managed college with high-quality teaching in all subjects. The students were responsive, well behaved and well protected.

Ofsted noted that this is a smaller than average school, where the proportion of pupils with SEND who receive support is well above average, and those eligible for the pupil premium or who have a statement of SEN or an education, health and care plan is average. The school is mono-cultural with the proportion of pupils who speak English as an additional language below average.

Campus
The UTC is housed in the former Connaught factory.

References

External links

Norfolk
Secondary schools in Norfolk
Educational institutions established in 2014
2014 establishments in England
University of East Anglia